Morris Lake is the longest and deepest lake in Dartmouth,Nova Scotia's Halifax Regional Municipality reaching depth of 50ft in the middle and 14 to 25ft in most other parts of the lake. 
Bordering the communities of Dartmouth, Shearwater and Cole Harbour.

The lake is bounded by Shearwater and Portland Estates on the west, Cole Harbour on the east and south, and Portland Hills on the north. The shoreline is mostly developed on the northwest end. The Dartmouth Refinery on the shore of Halifax Harbour draws water from the lake for cooling. CFB Shearwater also uses a portion of the lake for helicopter practice manoeuvres and it also maintains a small recreational beach.

Recreational areas 
Macdonalds Beach CFB Shearwater
Kiwanis Park Beach

Other lakes of the same name in Nova Scotia
Guysborough County at

References
 Morris Lake

Landforms of Halifax, Nova Scotia
Lakes of Nova Scotia
Landforms of Halifax County, Nova Scotia